Sohrevardi is a neighbourhood of Tehran, Iran. It is named after Shahab al-Din Suhrawardi, an Iranian philosopher, and it starts from Seyed khandan bridge to Bahar shiraz Street.

References

Neighbourhoods in Tehran